The Church of Santa María de Celón ( is a Romanesque-style, Roman Catholic parish church in the diocese of Celón in the municipality of Allande, community of Asturias, Spain. 

Maria de Celon|Allande
Allande
Allande
Bien de Interés Cultural landmarks in the Province of Alicante